Kuznetsky District is an administrative and municipal district (raion), one of the twenty-seven in Penza Oblast, Russia. It is located in the east of the oblast. Its administrative center is the town of Kuznetsk (which is not administratively a part of the district). Population: 38,056 (2010 Census);

Administrative and municipal status
Within the framework of administrative divisions, Kuznetsky District is one of the twenty-seven in the oblast. The town of Kuznetsk serves as its administrative center, despite being incorporated separately as a town of oblast significance—an administrative unit with the status equal to that of the districts.

As a municipal division, the district is incorporated as Kuznetsky Municipal District. The town of oblast significance of Kuznetsk is incorporated separately from the district as Kuznetsk Urban Okrug.

Notable residents 

Viktor Ilyukhin (1949–2011), State Duma deputy, born in Sosnovka
Yevgeny Rodionov (1977–1996), Russian soldier captured and executed by Chechen rebels in the First Chechen War, born in Chibirley

References

Notes

Sources



Districts of Penza Oblast